The 1905–06 Football League season was Aston Villa's 18th season in the First Division, the top flight of English football at the time. The season fell in what was to be called Villa's golden era.

Aston Villa started the new year having been defeated by Blackburn Rovers meaning that they had a record of DWL in the three post-Christmas fixtures. January's bad weather meant the trip to Sunderland was postponed until the end of January

During the season Howard Spencer was captain of the club.

In February 1905, after 167 league games, Harry Hadley left West Brom to join Aston Villa for a fee of £250, but played just 11 times before joining Nottingham Forest in April 1906.

Football League

First team squad
  Billy Garraty, 37 appearances
  Howard Spencer, 37 appearances
  Billy George, 36 appearances, conceded 53
  Harry Hampton, 35 appearances
  Albert Hall, 34 appearances
  Joe Bache, 34 appearances
  Joe Pearson, 30 appearances
  Alex Leake, 26 appearances
   Jack Windmill, 16 appearances
  Billy Brawn, 15 appearances
  Albert Evans, 15 appearances
  Albert Wilkes, 8 appearances
  George Harris, 8 appearances
 Jimmy Cantrell, 8 appearances
  Billy Matthews, 7 appearances
  Freddie Miles, 7 appearances
 Harry Cooch, 6 appearances, conceded 9
  Micky Noon, 5 appearances
 Watty Corbett, 4 appearances
 Walter Brown, 1 appearance

Arrivals
George Garratt, 17 appearances
Samuel Greenhalgh, 12 appearances
Harry Hadley, 11 appearances
Jock Logan, 11 appearances
John Boden, 10 appearances
Joey Walters, 8 appearances
Charlie Millington, 7 appearances
Bert Kingaby, 4 appearances
Tom Riley, 4 appearances
Barney Allen, 3 appearances
Rowland Codling, 3 appearances
Joe Hisbent, 2 appearances, served in the Worcestershire Regiment during the First World War.
Arthur Elston, 1 appearance

Exits
 Josiah Gray
  Alf Wood left in May 1905 having scored seven goals in 111 league and cup games. 
  Willie Clarke, the first Black professional footballer to score in the English Football League.
  George Johnson to Plymouth Argyle
  Mart Watkins to Sunderland. A short career at Villa Park playing just six matches and scoring once.

References

External links
Aston Villa official website
avfchistory.co.uk 1905–06 season

Aston Villa F.C. seasons
Aston Villa